Beach volleyball at the 2018 Asian Games was held in Palembang, Indonesia from August 19 to 28, 2018. In this edition, 19 nations played in the men's competition, and 10 nations participated in women's competition.

Schedule

Medalists

Medal table

Participating nations
A total of 100 athletes from 19 nations competed in beach volleyball at the 2018 Asian Games:

Final standing

Men

Women

References

External links
AVC page

 
2018 Asian Games events
2018
Asian Games